William Ryerson Dempsey (1832 – 1914) was a farmer and politician in Ontario, Canada. He represented Prince Edward in the Legislative Assembly of Ontario from 1898 to 1902 as a Conservative member.

The son of William Dempsey and Sarah Mikel, he was born in Prince Edward County, Upper Canada and was educated at the normal school in Toronto. Dempsey taught school for several years and then became a fruit grower and fruit dealer. He served as township reeve for six years and was warden for Prince Edward County, also serving as a justice of the peace. Dempsey was a captain in the militia during the Fenian raids. He married Emily Boulter.

References

External links

1832 births
1934 deaths
People from Prince Edward County, Ontario
Progressive Conservative Party of Ontario MPPs